Alexander Bicks (March 17, 1901 – May 9, 1963) was an American lawyer and jurist who served as a United States district judge of the United States District Court for the Southern District of New York.

Early life and education

Born in the Russian Empire, Bicks received a Bachelor of Laws from New York University School of Law in 1922.

Career 
Bicks worked in private practice in New York City, New York from 1924 to 1954. On April 6, 1954, Bicks was nominated by President Dwight D. Eisenhower to a seat on the United States District Court for the Southern District of New York vacated by Judge Vincent L. Leibell. Bicks was confirmed by the United States Senate on May 11, 1954, and received his commission on May 12, 1954. He served in that capacity until his death on May 9, 1963, in New York City.

Personal life 
Bicks's son, Rober Bicks was a lawyer who served in the United States Department of Justice Antitrust Division.

See also
 List of Jewish American jurists

References

External links
 

1963 deaths
New York University School of Law alumni
Judges of the United States District Court for the Southern District of New York
United States district court judges appointed by Dwight D. Eisenhower
20th-century American judges
1901 births
20th-century American lawyers